Harry Christian Lund Nielsen (born 31 October 1930) is a Danish rower. He competed at the 1952 Summer Olympics in Helsinki with the men's coxless four where they were eliminated in the round one repêchage.

References

1930 births

Living people 
Danish male rowers
Olympic rowers of Denmark
Rowers at the 1952 Summer Olympics
Sportspeople from Aarhus
European Rowing Championships medalists